Lung cancer screening refers to cancer screening strategies used to identify early lung cancers before they cause symptoms, at a point where they are more likely to be curable. Lung cancer screening is critically important because of the incidence and prevalence of lung cancer. More than 235,000 new cases of lung cancer are expected in the United States in 2021 with approximately 130,000 deaths expected in 2021. In addition, at the time of diagnosis, 57% of lung cancers are discovered in advanced stages (III and IV), meaning they are more widespread  or aggressive cancers. Because there is a substantially higher probability of long-term survival following treatment of localized (60%) versus advanced stage (6%) lung cancer, lung cancer screening aims to diagnose the disease in the localized (stage I) stage.

Results from large randomized studies have recently prompted a large number of professional organizations and governmental agencies in the U.S. to now recommend lung cancer screening in select populations. The 3 main types of lung cancer screening are low-dose, computerized tomographic (LDCT) screening, chest x-rays, and sputum cytology tests. Currently multiple professional organizations, as well as the United States Preventive Services Task Force (USPSTF), the Centers for Medicare and Medicaid Services (CMS) and the European Commission's science advisors concur and endorse low-dose, computerized tomographic screening for individuals at high-risk of lung cancer.

Current guidelines

The 2021 U.S. Preventive Services Task Force guidelines recommends annual screening for lung cancer with low-dose computed tomography in adults aged 50 to 80 years who have a 20 pack-year smoking history and currently smoke or have quit within the past 15 years. Screening should be discontinued once a person has not smoked for 15 years or develops a health problem that substantially limits life expectancy or the ability or willingness to have curative lung surgery.

The definition of those considered to be at sufficiently high risk to benefit from screening varies according to different guidelines. The National Comprehensive Cancer Network suggests screening for two high risk groups. Group 1 guidelines include 55–77 years of age, 30 or more pack years of smoking and has quit within the past 14 years, and are a current smoker. Group 2 includes those 50 years of age or older, 20 or more pack years of smoking, and other risk factors excluding second-hand smoke. Other risk factors include contact with cancer-causing agents (radon, arsenic, beryllium, cadmium, chromium, nickel, asbestos, coal smoke, soot, silica, diesel fumes), history of cancer, family history of lung cancer, or a history of COPD or pulmonary fibrosis.

In 2022, the European Commission's Scientific Advice Mechanism concluded that "there is a strong scientific basis for introducing lung screening for current and ex-smokers using the latest technologies, such as low-dose CT scanning".

Risks of screening
Low-dose CT screening has been associated with falsely positive test results which may result in unneeded treatment. In a series of studies assessing the frequence of false positive rates, results reported that rates ranged from 8-49%. The false-positive rate declined when more screening rounds were performed. Other concerns include radiation exposure, the cost of testing alone, and the cost if follow up of tests and screenings. False reassurance from false negative findings, over-diagnosis, short term anxiety/distress, and increased rate of incidental findings are other risks. The currently used low dose CT scan results in a radiation exposure of about 2 millisieverts (equal to roughly 20 two view chest x-rays).  It has been estimated that radiation exposure from repeated screening studies could induce cancer formation in a small percentage of screened subjects, so this risk should be mitigated by a (relatively) high prevalence of lung cancer in the population being screened.

Attendance 
Deprivation can reduce the numbers of people attending lung cancer screening. A UK study showed that making the screening easily accessible increased take-up. Providing mobile screening units parked in supermarket car parks, for example, in the poorer areas of Manchester was an acceptable way of offering lung checks to high-risk groups such as smokers. A simple test measured obstruction to the flow of air in and out of the lungs. A third of the tests showed airflow obstruction, a sign of chronic obstructive pulmonary disease which is a risk factor for lung cancer and other health conditions.

History

Systematic examination of lung cancer screening began in the 1970s when the National Cancer Institute sponsored clinical trials to examine chest x-rays and sputum cytology at Johns Hopkins, Memorial Sloan-Kettering Cancer Center, and Mayo Clinic. In the Mayo Clinic study, termed "The Mayo Lung Project," researchers randomized over 9000 male smokers age 45 and older to receive either chest x-ray and sputum screening three times a year or annual chest x-ray screening. The results showed that more frequent screening resulted in higher resectability rate (more early-stage detection) but made no difference in mortality from lung cancer. Chest x-ray screenings were found to detect 6 times as many new cancers as sputum tests, proving the disutility of sputum tests in lung cancer screening. Unfortunately, results from the Mayo Lung Project and the Hopkins and Memorial Sloan-Kettering studies were eventually discredited due to failure to account for lead time and length time bias. Since none demonstrated reduced lung cancer incidence or mortality between randomized groups, chest x-ray was determined to be an ineffective screening tool.

In the following years, the scientific community shifted its attention to computer tomography (CT). In 1996, results were published of a study of 1369 subjects screened in Japan that revealed that 73% of lung cancers that were missed by chest x-ray were able to be detected by CT scan. Among the earliest United States-based clinical trials was the Early Lung Cancer Action Project (ELCAP), which published its results in 1999. ELCAP screened 1000 volunteers with low-dose CT and chest x-ray. They were able to detect non-calcified nodules in 23% of patients by CT compared with 7% by chest x-ray. While this trial and a similar trial conducted by Mayo Clinic in 2005 demonstrated that CT was able to detect lung cancer at a higher rate than chest x-ray, both these trials used survival improvement, rather than mortality reduction,  as an outcome, and thus were unable to prove that the use of CTs in lung cancer screening was actually impacting the number of people dying from lung cancer.

In 2006, results of CT screening on over 31,000 high-risk patients- an expansion study of the Early Lung Cancer Action Project - was published in the New England Journal of Medicine. In this study, 85% of the 484 detected lung cancers were stage I and thus highly treatable. Historically, such stage I patients would have an expected 10-year survival of 88%. Critics of the I-ELCAP study point out that there was no randomization of patients (all received CT scans and there was no comparison group receiving only chest x-rays) and the patients were not actually followed out to 10 years post detection (the median followup was 40 months).

In contrast, a March 2007 study in the Journal of the American Medical Association (JAMA) found no mortality benefit from CT-based lung cancer screening. 3,200 current or former smokers were screened for 4 years and offered 3 or 4 CT scans. Lung cancer diagnoses were 3 times as high, and surgeries were 10 times as high, as predicted by a model, but there were no significant differences between observed and expected numbers of advanced cancers or deaths. Additional controversy arose after a 2008 New York Times reported that the 2006, pro-CT scan study in the New England Journal of Medicine had been funded indirectly by the parent company of the Liggett Group, a tobacco company.

In 2011, the National Lung Screening Trial found that CT screening offers benefits over other screenings. This study was recognized for providing supporting evidence for using CT to screen for lung cancer and for encouraging others to reflect on the merits and drawbacks of other types of screening. This trial led to a recommendation in the United States that CT screening be used on people at high risk for developing lung cancer in an effort to detect the cancer earlier and reduce mortality.

Development of guidelines 
After the National Cancer Institute's National Lung Screening Trial publication in 2011, many national organizations revised their guidelines.

In December 2013, the U.S. Preventive Services Task Force (USPSTF) changed its long-standing recommendation that there is insufficient evidence to recommend for or against screening for lung cancer to the following: "The USPSTF recommends annual screening for lung cancer with low-dose computed tomography in adults ages 55 to 80 years who have a 30 pack-year smoking history and currently smoke or have quit within the past 15 years. Screening should be discontinued once a person has not smoked for 15 years or develops a health problem that substantially limits life expectancy or the ability or willingness to have curative lung surgery".

Similarly, clinical practice guidelines previously issued by the American College of Chest Physicians (ACCP) in 2007 recommended against routine screening for lung cancer because of a lack of evidence that such screening was effective. The 2013 ACCP guidelines take into account findings from the National Lung Screening Trial and state: "For smokers and former smokers who are age 55 to 74 and who have smoked for 30 pack-years or more and either continue to smoke or have quit within the past 15 years, we suggest that annual screening with low-dose CT (LDCT) should be offered over both annual screening with CXR or no screening, but only in settings that can deliver the comprehensive care provided to National Lung Screening Trial participants (Grade 2B)". The most recent 2021 guidelines divide their seven recommendations into "strong" and "weak" and the evidence behind it as "moderate-quality" and "low-quality". Their one strong recommendation with moderate-quality evidence is: "For asymptomatic individuals age 55 to 77 who have smoked 30 pack years or more and either continue to smoke or have quit within the past 15 years, we recommend that annual screening with low-dose CT should be offered."

Guidelines were released initially in 2012 by the National Comprehensive Cancer Network, an alliance of now 31 cancer centers in the United States. Their consensus guidelines, which are  updated annually, support screening as a process, not a single test, and discuss risks and benefits of screening in high risk individuals within a comprehensive multidisciplinary program.  Screening is only recommended for individuals defined as high risk meeting specific criteria.  More details can be found in their patient guidelines. While lung cancer screening programs have been supported by the  NCCN, International Association for the Study of Lung Cancer (IASLC), American Cancer Society, The American Society of Clinical Oncology (ASCO), and other organizations, the costs of screening may not be covered by medical insurance policies, unless the eligibility criteria specified by the Centers for Medicare and Medicaid Services (CMS) are met. As of 2017 usage of lung cancer screening in the U.S. after Medicare agreed to pay for screening and after guidelines were published was low, with the most uptake in the Midwest. In 2017 a task force published a review of evidence and recommendations for advancing implementation.

The English National Health Service was in 2014 re-examining the evidence for screening. In 2019, the NHS implemented the Targeted Lung Health Checks (TLHC) program in order to target those most at risk of lung cancer.

In 2022, the European Union proposed to update its guidelines on cancer screening to take into account new evidence that had emerged since 2016. A comprehensive evidence review by the European Commission's Scientific Advice Mechanism recommended lung cancer screening for current and ex-smokers, combined with smoking cessation programmes.

References

Lung cancer
Cancer screening